Hyperlinks are, at present, a novel feature in virtual world platforms, aside from hyperlinks in the in-built chat clients between users' avatars. In the latter 2000s, however, a number of architectures were created for various decentralized virtual world platforms in order to facilitate easier travel of avatars between two or more separately-hosted grids or servers.

Space-linking in OpenCobalt

Open Cobalt uses a method of hyperlinking, known as "space-linking", which resembles a window frame or portal and, when revolved, shows a 360-degree real-time view of one region to a user in another region; such portals can also be walked through by users. Space-linking is an alternative to teleportation, a more common means of traversing between regions or spaces, and is also a primary means of travelling between whole grids.

Like MediaWiki's redlinks, such portals are also used to link to uncreated spaces or regions (colored in black) in order to indicate the need to create newer spaces.

Hypergrid in OpenSim
OpenSimulator also uses an architecture known as "Hypergrid", which allows users to teleport between multiple OpenSim-based virtual worlds by providing a hyperlinked map which indexes public grids. This allows for public grids to retain teleportation links to each other without having to be on the same grid.

References

External links
 Roy Ruddle: Navigating Discontinuous Virtual Worlds
 Portals: increasing visibility in virtual worlds

Hypermedia
Virtual reality